Winston Francis Cenac Q.C. (14 September 1925 – 22 September 2004) was a civil servant and politician from Saint Lucia. He was the third elected Prime Minister of independent Saint Lucia.

He served as General Procurator for Saint Lucia, Saint Vincent and the Grenadines and Grenada. 
In 1969 he gave up public service to become a lawyer. Elected representative when the Saint Lucia Labour Party gained power in 1979, Cenac became attorney general in the Allan Louisy administration. Cenac became Prime Minister upon Louisy's resignation on 4 May 1981. He served for 8 months until he too was forced into resignation on 17 January 1982. he was replaced in his position by Michael Pilgrim.

Life 
In 1952 he obtained the bachelor of laws of London University as an external student. He was appointed the attorney general of Saint Lucia in 1964. He was also the attorney general of Saint Vincent in 1967 and attorney general of Grenada from 1967 to 1970. In 1971, Cenac acted as judge in Saint Kitts for six months.

He died on 22 September 2004 and is buried in Castries City Cemetery.

Family 
His brother, Sir Neville Cenac, was also a prominent politician in Saint Lucia until his appointment as Governor-General in 2018.

See also
 Saint Lucia Labour Party
 List of prime ministers of Saint Lucia
 Politics of Saint Lucia

References

External links
Office of the Prime Minister of Saint Lucia
Biography available in Prime Ministers of Saint Lucia

1925 births
2004 deaths
People from Castries Quarter
Prime Ministers of Saint Lucia
Saint Lucia Labour Party politicians
Alumni of the University of London
Saint Lucian judges